Joanna Stern (born December 5, 1984) is an American technology journalist, best known for her videos and columns at The Wall Street Journal and technology news websites Engadget and The Verge. She became a personal technology columnist at The Wall Street Journal in 2014, as part of the team that replaced Walt Mossberg.

Journalism 
Stern began her technology writing career at Laptop Magazine, where she reviewed laptops and netbooks. She then spent three years at Engadget, as reviews editor, writing various consumer technology reviews. In March 2011, she left Engadget with Joshua Topolsky, Nilay Patel, Paul Miller, Chris Ziegler and other co-workers to create This Is My Next, which would later become The Verge.

In February 2012, she joined ABC News as a technology editor, hosting her own video series and appearing on the TV network's various shows as a technology expert.

In December 2013, she and Geoffrey A. Fowler were named personal technology columnists at The Wall Street Journal. In 2016, Stern received a Gerald Loeb Award for her Wall Street Journal videos, including her video review of the Apple Watch (which includes a cameo appearance by Rupert Murdoch) and another where she "rode" on a router that had a shape like a spaceship. She is also a CNBC contributor, often appearing on Tech Check. In September 2021, she won a News & Documentary Emmy Award for her Wall Street Journal documentary on death and technology. Stern received a second Gerald Loeb Award in 2022 for an article on TikTok.

Personal life 
In February 2009, Stern met her future wife on Twitter and then proposed to her on Twitter in 2013. They live in the New York area with their children and dog Browser. She has written an article that jokingly names Browser as a co-author. They have two sons. Stern is Jewish and speaks Hebrew.

References

American women journalists
1985 births
Gerald Loeb Award winners for Audio and Video
Living people
American technology journalists
American LGBT journalists
21st-century American women
Jewish American journalists
American Jews